Michael J. "Mike" Sheridan (born September 17, 1958) is an American politician who served as the 77th Speaker of the Wisconsin State Assembly.  A Democrat, he represented the 44th Assembly District from 2005 to 2011. He was a member of the Committees on Rules and Assembly Organization and was elected to serve as Speaker by the Democratic caucus on November 12, 2008, following the 2008 general election in which the Democratic Party gained a majority in the Assembly.

Biography

Sheridan was born in Janesville, Wisconsin. He attended George S. Parker High School from which he graduated in 1977. He later earned his associate degree at University of Wisconsin–Rock County in 2004. Before entering politics he worked as an auto assembly worker for General Motors Janesville Assembly, during which he was an active member of the United Auto Workers Union Local 95, of which he has been president.

In March 2007, the Milwaukee Journal Sentinel reported on a bill sponsored by Sheridan and State Rep. Eugene Hahn of Cambria, Wisconsin that would offer a $1,000 tax credit for buyers of flex-fuel vehicles, representing a benefit for the automobile and ethanol industries. Hahn was reported to have an investment in an ethanol company, and Sheridan's position at the UAW was highlighted. The Janesville Gazette editorialized that the Janesville economy was dependent on the success of the GM plant, and "arguably his biggest concern. Voters expect him to fight for GM's interests at the Capitol."

In February 2010, Sheridan admitted dating a lobbyist for payday lenders at a time when the Wisconsin Legislature was debating regulating the industry. On November 2, 2010, Sheridan was defeated for reelection. In April 2014, Sheridan announced he would run for the Wisconsin State Senate seat being vacated by Tim Cullen. On August 12, 2014, Sheridan came in a weak third in the Democratic primary election, behind former Cullen aide Austin Scieszinski and the winner, State Representative Janis Ringhand.

References

External links
 Sponsored bills
Mike Sheridan campaign website (archived)
 
 
 Follow the Money - Michael J Sheridan
2008 2006 2004 campaign contributions
Campaign 2008 campaign contributions at Wisconsin Democracy Campaign

Speakers of the Wisconsin State Assembly
Democratic Party members of the Wisconsin State Assembly
1958 births
Living people
Politicians from Janesville, Wisconsin
21st-century American politicians